(literally Mouth of the Warnow) is a seaside resort and a district of the city of Rostock in Mecklenburg, Germany. It is located on the Baltic Sea and, as the name implies, at the estuary of the river Warnow.  is one of the world's busiest cruise ports.

History 

Founded in about 1200,  was for centuries a small fishing village with minor importance for the economic and cultural development of the region. In 1323  lost its autonomous status as it was purchased by the city of Rostock in order to safeguard the city's access to the Baltic Sea. It was not until the 19th century that  began to develop into an important seaside resort. Today  has approximately 8,400 inhabitants.

Economy 

Once completely dependent on the fishing industry, 's economic alignment has shifted inevitably from the primary to the secondary and tertiary sector. Besides the Nordic Yards Warnemünde ship yard (the former ), the economy largely depends on tourism. The construction of a modern cruise line centre in 2005 has contributed crucially to 's establishment as the most important harbour for cruise line ships in Germany.

 was formerly the site of the original LFG aircraft factories during World War I. Prior to World War II a number of other companies, mostly related in some way to the now bankrupt LFG, started operations in the area. The factories and surrounding living areas were bombed several times during the war. Many of these factories were used to form .

Sights 

Being a centre of maritime traffic, the district of  comprises numerous navigational aids, the oldest being the lighthouse, built in 1897, and still currently in use. Warnemünde's other famous landmark, the nearby  (Teapot in German) with its  curved roof, is an interesting living example of East German architecture. Rebuilt in the 1960s with a curved roof and renovated in 2002, it today houses various restaurants.

In the vicinity of the canal called  (Old Channel), with its various restaurants, pubs and traditional fishing boats, regional specialities are offered in a fish market. The Warnemünde Church was built on the western edge of the town in 1866 and consecrated in 1871.

The model includes Pluto and has not been updated since Pluto was reclassified as a dwarf planet. Walking along the  allows hikers to get an intuitive idea of the relative distances between the orbits of the planets and the Sun.

Climate
The district of  has a Baltic-influenced oceanic climate (Cfb) according to the Köppen climate classification system.

Culture and sport

There are a lot of musicians and bands in  who are involved in cultural events.

Irish Coffee
Heide Mundo

Sport 

Because of the weak current and good sailing conditions,  is a major sailing area in Germany. The beach is especially good for kitesurfing, windsurfing, underwater diving, swimming and nordic walking. In the summertime there are a lot of international competitions like the yearly sailing event  Week in July.

Personalities 

 Stephan Jantzen (1827–1913), seaman, commander of the Pilots and Rescue Team
 Ernst Heinkel (1888–1958) he established the Heinkel-Flugzeugwerke company at Warnemünde in 1922, a prominent Nazi.
 Karl Heinz Robrahn (1913–1987), lyricist
 Maria Hasse (1921 in Warnemünde – 2014), a German mathematician who became the first female professor in the faculty of mathematics and science at TU Dresden .
 Klaus Lass (born 1950), singer and songwriter, city-guide
 Matthias Hahn (born 1965), former handball player and currently coach.

References

Notes and inline references

External links 

 Warnemünde official page
 Warnemünde Panoramas
 Cruiseline port of Warnemünde
 Warnemünde Week
 Edvard Munch House

Rostock
Seaside resorts in Germany
Spa towns in Germany
Tourism in Germany
Marinas in Germany
Populated coastal places in Germany (Baltic Sea)
Rostock-Warnemunde
Tourist attractions in Rostock